Aleksander Augustynowicz (born February 7, 1865 in Iskrzynia, died August 23, 1944 in Warsaw) was a Polish painter, active between 1865 and 1944 in Poland.

Biography
Aleksander Augustynowicz was born in Iskrzynia on February 7, to his father Wincenty, a landlord and his mother, Julia from the House of Habecki. He completed his secondary education in Rzeszów, in the following years of 1883 to 1886 he studied at the Jan Matejko Academy of Fine Arts in Kraków, where he was led by Feliks Szynalewski, Władysław Łuszczkiewicz, and Jan Matejko. To complete his studies he moved to Munich, and participated in artist travels to Italy and Hungary. In 1890, he moved to Lwów (today Lviv in Ukraine; then Poland) where he began his artist career. He spent time in Zakopane between 1914 and 1921, in 1921 he moved to live in Poznań, where he already had a settled position within the local artists, as during World War I he exhibited his paintings with the Society of Artists. In 1925, he became a member of the Society of the Incentive for Fine Arts (Towarzystwo Zachęty Sztuk Pięknych) in Warsaw. In 1935, in Poznań he celebrated his fiftieth anniversary of creativity, during which his artworks were put in a retrospective exhibition. After the start of World War II he moved to Warsaw, where he was killed during the Warsaw Uprising.

He was married to Anna Czemeryńska (1895), with whom he had three daughters: Stanisława (born 1897), Zofia (1899-1935), and Aleksandra (born 1901).

Aleksander Augustynowicz painted portraits, which were exhibited in national and international exhibitions. In 1925, during the Portrait of Poland (Portret polski) exhibition in Warsaw, he was awarded the highest honorary title for all of his artworks. In Poznań he painted numerous portraits (inter alia of Wojciech Trąmpczyński, Ignacy Mościcki, and Witold Celichowski), many of which were painted in watercolour. Most of his paintings are made from watercolour and are themed on landscapes and Polish folklore; his artworks are currently exhibited in numerous museums around Poland and in private ownership. Fourteen of his watercolour and oil artworks are located in the National Museum in Poznań.

On November 11, 1937 he received the Officer's Cross of the Order of Polonia Restituta from the President of Poland Ignacy Mościcki, for his service in the field of art (za zasługi na polu sztuki).

Selected paintings

References

External links

1865 births
1944 deaths
19th-century Polish painters
19th-century Polish male artists
20th-century Polish painters
20th-century Polish male artists
Polish male painters
Polish civilians killed in World War II